Sharpe's Christmas, is a short story collection by historical fiction author Bernard Cornwell which he  began conceptualising in 1980s. It contains two stories featuring Cornwell's fictional hero Richard Sharpe. It was published by The Sharpe Appreciation Society  in 2003 in order to raise funds for The Bernard and Judy Cornwell Foundation. This novel contains two stories that take place at different times, thus in an interview with the author, the book was left unnumbered in the Sharpe’s series.

Contents
The two short stories, "Sharpe's Christmas" and "Sharpe's Ransom", contained within this book were originally written for British newspaper the Daily Mail, which serialised them during Christmas seasons of 1994 and 1995 respectively. These were later extended by the author for inclusion in this collection.

Sharpe's Christmas

Set in 1813, towards the end of the Peninsular War, chronologically this story falls after Sharpe's Regiment.

Sharpe's Ransom

Set in peacetime after Sharpe's Waterloo this story providing a glimpse of Sharpe's life in Normandy with Lucille.

References

External links
 Section from Bernard Cornwell's website on Sharpe's Christmas

2003 short story collections
Christmas
Historical short story collections
War short stories
Christmas short story collections
Richard Sharpe short stories
Works by Bernard Cornwell